Maurice V. Brady (January 18, 1904 – November 5, 1991) was an American politician who served in the New Jersey General Assembly from the Hudson district from 1952 to 1968. He served as Speaker of the New Jersey General Assembly in 1960 and 1966.

References

1904 births
1991 deaths
Speakers of the New Jersey General Assembly
Democratic Party members of the New Jersey General Assembly
Politicians from Bayonne, New Jersey
20th-century American politicians